The 2018 UCI World Tour was a competition that included thirty-seven road cycling events throughout the 2018 men's cycling season. It was the tenth and final edition of the ranking system launched by the Union Cycliste Internationale (UCI) in 2009. The competition began with the opening stage of the Tour Down Under on 16 January and concluded with the final stage of the Tour of Guangxi on 21 October. Belgium's Greg Van Avermaet was the defending champion.

Summary
Van Avermaet was unable to defend his World Tour title, as he failed to take a single individual win – he was a part of three team time trial victories for the  however – as he finished fifth in the points rankings. The rankings were topped for the first time by British rider Simon Yates, riding for the  team, who amassed 3,072 points over the course of the season. Yates was the last of four riders to take the overall lead of standings during the season; he had ranked highly in the standings earlier in 2018, taking stage victories at Paris–Nice, and the Volta a Catalunya, before a break-through performance at the Giro d'Italia with three stage wins and thirteen days in the race lead; ultimately, Yates cracked in the mountains during the third week and ceded overall victory to compatriot Chris Froome. After another stage win and a second-place overall finish at the Tour de Pologne, Yates won his first Grand Tour at the Vuelta a España, taking the race lead definitively after a stage victory on stage fourteen, and the rankings lead when the race concluded.

Sagan led the standings for most of the season, having recorded consistent top-six finishes during the spring Classic races, with victories at Gent–Wevelgem, and for the first time, Paris–Roubaix. Sagan won three stages at the Tour de France as he won a record-equalling sixth points classification victory, but was unable to win any stages at the Vuelta a España, where Yates took the lead. Valverde held the rankings lead in the spring, winning two general classifications at the Abu Dhabi Tour, and the Volta a Catalunya, in February and March – winning three stages over those races as well – before two stage victories and victory in the points classification at the Vuelta a España.

In the concurrent teams' standings,  prevailed with 13,425.97 points, having held the classification lead for three-quarters of the season, and not been headed since late March. The team took 37 victories – out of a total of 73 wins during all UCI-classified races – at the World Tour level, including seven overall victories taken by Niki Terpstra (E3 Harelbeke and the Tour of Flanders), Yves Lampaert (Dwars door Vlaanderen), Julian Alaphilippe (La Flèche Wallonne and Clásica de San Sebastián), Bob Jungels (Liège–Bastogne–Liège), and Elia Viviani (EuroEyes Cyclassics). The team also took 13 stage victories at the Grand Tours, with two classification jerseys won by Viviani (points at the Giro d'Italia), and Alaphilippe, who won the polka-dot jersey at the Tour de France. 2017 teams classification winners  finished second with 10,213 points, with the team winning two of the three Grand Tours; Froome became the seventh rider to win all three Grand Tours with his Giro d'Italia success, while Geraint Thomas won the Tour de France, after success at the Critérium du Dauphiné.  took four other general classification victories: Michał Kwiatkowski won Tirreno–Adriatico, and the Tour de Pologne, Egan Bernal won the Tour of California in his first season with the team, while Gianni Moscon won the season-ending Tour of Guangxi. With 9,201 points,  finished in third place primarily down to Sagan's performances, with further wins to Jay McCarthy (Cadel Evans Great Ocean Road Race), and Pascal Ackermann at the RideLondon–Surrey Classic. Ackermann and Sam Bennett also took eleven World Tour stage victories between them during the season, with Bennett taking three at a Grand Tour, in the Giro d'Italia.

Teams

Events

Final points standings

Individual

For riders that had the same number of points, ties in placings were resolved by number of victories, then number of second places, third places, and so on, in World Tour events and stages.

 418 riders scored points. 198 other riders finished in positions that would have earned them points, but they were ineligible as members of non-UCI WorldTeams.

Team
For the team rankings, this was calculated by adding the ranking points of all the riders of a team.

Leader progress

Notes

References

Sources

External links

 
2018
2018 in men's road cycling